Yekaterina Alexeyevna Sinyavina (1761–1784) was a Russian composer and pianist. In 1781, at the court of Catherine II she was the harpsichordist for what was probably the first performance of a harpsichord concerto by Giovanni Paisiello. She composed numerous short instrumental and keyboard pieces for private court occasions. Her harpsichord sonatas with violin accompaniment, now lost, are among the earliest known examples of keyboard sonatas by a composer of Russian origin. She served as a lady-in-waiting and composer at the court, married Count Simon Romanovich Vorontsov and died in St. Petersburg.

References

Year of birth missing
1784 deaths
Music educators from the Russian Empire
Composers from the Russian Empire
Women classical composers
Ladies-in-waiting from the Russian Empire
18th-century musicians from the Russian Empire
18th-century women musicians from the Russian Empire
18th-century women composers